Queen of the Falls is a 2011 fiction novel by children's writer Chris Van Allsburg.

Plot summary
Queen of the Falls is about a 62-year-old woman named Annie Edson Taylor who remembers getting closer and closer to Niagara Falls with her father, entranced by the sight and sound of the water. Finally, as a 62-year-old, she goes over the falls in a wooden barrel, seeking fortune and fame.

References

http://blogs.slj.com/afuse8production/2011/01/15/review-of-the-day-queen-of-the-falls-by-chris-van-allsburg/
http://www.nytimes.com/2011/04/27/books/review/childrens-books-queen-of-the-falls-by-chris-van-allsburg-nurse-soldier-spy-by-marissa-moss.html
https://www.carthage.edu/childrens-literature/book-reviews/v/queen-of-the-falls-by-chris-van-allsburg/
https://www.wired.com/2011/04/review-queen-of-the-falls-goes-over-well/
https://www.kirkusreviews.com/book-reviews/chris-van-allsburg/queen-falls/

Sources

2011 American novels
American children's novels
Niagara Falls
Novels by Chris Van Allsburg
Picture books by Chris Van Allsburg
2011 children's books
Houghton Mifflin books